International Soccer Challenge is a soccer video game developed by MicroStyle in 1990.

Game play 

The game is quite similar to MicroProse Soccer, but uses a 3D perspective.

References

External links 
 International Soccer Challenge at MobyGames
 International Soccer Challenge at the Hall of Light

1990 video games
Amiga games
Association football video games
Atari ST games
DOS games
MicroProse games
Multiplayer and single-player video games
Red Rat Software games
Video games developed in the United Kingdom
Video games scored by David Whittaker